Rabod Wilhelm von Kröcher (30 June 1880 – 25 December 1945) was a German horse rider who competed in the 1912 Summer Olympics. He won the silver medal in the equestrian individual jumping with his horse “Dohna”.

References

1880 births
1945 deaths
German male equestrians
Equestrians at the 1912 Summer Olympics
Olympic equestrians of Germany
Olympic silver medalists for Germany
German show jumping riders
Olympic medalists in equestrian
Medalists at the 1912 Summer Olympics